Ernst Seidl (born 29 January 1950) is an Austrian sailor. He competed at the 1972 Summer Olympics and the 1976 Summer Olympics.

References

External links
 

1950 births
Living people
Austrian male sailors (sport)
Olympic sailors of Austria
Sailors at the 1972 Summer Olympics – Flying Dutchman
Sailors at the 1976 Summer Olympics – Flying Dutchman
Place of birth missing (living people)